Emilia may refer to:

People
 Emilia (given name), list of people with this name

Places
 Emilia (region), a historical region of Italy. Reggio, Emilia
 Emilia-Romagna, an administrative region in Italy, including the historical regions of Emilia and Romagna
 Emilia, Łódź Voivodeship, a village in central Poland

Arts
 Emilia (Bulgarian singer) (born 1982), full name Emiliya Valeva, known by the mononym Emilia
 Emilia (Swedish singer), full name Emilia Rydberg, also performing as Emilia Mitiku and by the mononym Emilia
 Emilia (album), 2000 self-titled album by Swedish singer Emilia Rydberg
 Emilia Mernes, Argentine singer, known by the mononym Emilia
 Emilia (Sítio do Picapau Amarelo), a fictional character of the Sítio do Picapau Amarelo series
 Emilia (Othello), a character in Shakespeare's Othello
 Emilia (TV series), a Venezuelan telenovela
Emilia (play), a 2018 play by inspired by the life of the 17th century poet and feminist Emilia Bassano

Others
 Emilia (plant), a genus of plants in the family Asteraceae
 Emiliano-Romagnolo, a language spoken in Italy and San Marino
 Hurricane Emilia, a number of hurricanes named Emilia
 155 Infantry Division Emilia, an Italian infantry division of World War II

See also 
 Amelia (disambiguation)
 Aemilia (disambiguation)
 Emilian (disambiguation)